Pekka Antero Leimu (born 11 April 1947) is a Finnish former ice hockey center and Olympian.

Leimu played with Team Finland at the 1968 Winter Olympics held in Grenoble, France. He previously played for Ilves Tampere in SM-Liiga.

References

1947 births
Living people
Ice hockey players at the 1968 Winter Olympics
Olympic ice hockey players of Finland
Ice hockey people from Tampere
Ilves players
Finnish ice hockey centres